Notascea nudata is a moth of the  family Notodontidae. It is known only from Brazil.

External links
discoverlife.org

Notodontidae of South America
Moths described in 1925
Notodontidae